Hemidiaptomus is a genus of freshwater copepods in the family Diaptomidae, containing the following species:
Hemidiaptomus ignatovi G. O. Sars, 1903
Hemidiaptomus monticola Weisig & Ali-Zade, 1938
Hemidiaptomus rylovi Charin, 1928
Hemidiaptomus tarnogradskii Rylov, 1926

References

Diaptomidae
Taxonomy articles created by Polbot